Vyas Deo Prasad also known as Vyas Deo Prasad Kushwaha is an Indian politician, former Minister of state in the Government of Bihar from April 2008 to November 2010. He represented Siwan in the Bihar Legislative Assembly thrice in a row winning 2005, 2010, 2015 elections. In 2020 Bihar Legislative Assembly election, he was denied a ticket to contest from Siwan in favour of Om Prakash Yadav who lost the election to Awadh Bihari Choudhary.

References 

Bharatiya Janata Party politicians from Bihar
Living people
State cabinet ministers of Bihar
Bihar MLAs 2005–2010
Bihar MLAs 2010–2015
Bihar MLAs 2015–2020
Year of birth missing (living people)